In a game of chess, the pawn structure (sometimes known as the pawn skeleton) is the configuration of pawns on the chessboard. Because pawns are the least mobile of the chess pieces, the pawn structure is relatively static and thus plays a large role in determining the strategic character of the position.

General observations
Care must therefore be taken to avoid them (but there are exceptions—for instance see Boleslavsky hole below). In the absence of these structural weaknesses, it is not possible to assess a pawn formation as good or bad—much depends on the position of the pieces. The pawn formation does determine the overall strategies of the players to a large extent, however, even if arising from unrelated openings.

Pawn structures often transpose into one another, such as the Isolani into the Hanging pawns, and vice versa. Such transpositions must be considered carefully and often mark shifts in game strategy.

The major pawn formations
In his 1995 book Pawn Structure Chess, Andrew Soltis classified the major pawn formations into 17 categories. In 2015, the book Chess Structures, by Mauricio Flores Rios, further studied the subject, subdividing pawn structures into the 28 most important. For a formation to fall into a particular category, it need not have a pawn position identical to the corresponding diagram, but only close enough that the character of the game and the major themes are unchanged. It is typically the  whose position influences the nature of the game the most.

Structures with mutually attacking pawns are said to have tension. They are ordinarily unstable and tend to transpose into a stable formation with a pawn  or exchange. Play often revolves around making the transposition happen under favorable circumstances.

Caro formation

Openings: Primary: Caro–Kann. Other: French, Scandinavian (in the main line where white has to get the queen back from a5), Trompowsky (colors reversed), Alekhine's.

Character: Slow-paced game.

Themes for Black: Weakness of the d4-pawn, ...c6–c5 and ...e6–e5 breaks. The latter break is usually preferable, but harder for Black to achieve.

Slav formation 

Openings: Primary: Slav, Semi-Slav. Other: Catalan, Queen's Gambit Accepted, Queen's Gambit Declined, Nimzo-Indian, Colle System, London System, & Trompowsky (with the latter three having their colors reversed).

Character: Slow-paced game.

Themes for White: Pressure on the c-file, weakness of Black's c-pawn (either after Black's ...b7–b5 or after d4–d5xc6 in response to ...e6–e5), the d4–d5 break.

Themes for Black:  e6–e5 and c6–c5 breaks.

Sicilian – Scheveningen

Openings: Primary: Sicilian (Najdorf, Richter–Rauzer and Sozin variations), Sicilian Scheveningen, and several other Sicilian variations. Other: King's English (colors reversed).

Character: Complex, dynamic, sharp middlegame.

Themes for White: Pressure on the d-file, space advantage, e4–e5 break (often prepared with f2–f4), f2–f4–f5 push, g2–g4–g5  blitz (see Keres Attack).

Themes for Black:  Pressure on the c-file,  (and counterplay in general) on the queenside, pressure on White's pawn on e4 or e5, d6–d5 break, e6–e5 transposing into the Boleslavsky hole (see below).

It used to be considered unwise for White to exchange a piece on c6 allowing the recapture bxc6, because the phalanx of Black's center pawns was thought to become very strong; however modern chess engines have shown ways for White to maintain a slight advantage even with black's pawn on c6.

Sicilian – Dragon

Openings: Primary: Sicilian Dragon. Other: Pirc, King's English (with colors reversed).

Character: Either a razor sharp middlegame with opposite side castling or a moderately sharp game with same side castling. The Sicilian Dragon requires a high level of opening memorization to play properly. This is especially true when it comes to the Yugoslav Attack in which White plays the moves Be3, f3, Qd2 and 0-0-0. Other variations include the following: the Classical Dragon, where White plays Be2 and 0-0; the Tal Attack, defined by Bc4 and 0-0; and the Fianchetto Defense, where White plays g3, Bg2 and 0-0. These less common variations lead to less tactical positions, with a potentially technical endgame.

Themes for White: Outpost on d5, kingside attack (either f2–f4–f5 with kingside castling or h2–h4–h5 with queenside castling), weakness of Black's queenside pawn  in the endgame.

Themes for Black: Pressure on the long diagonal, queenside counterplay, exploiting White's often overextended kingside pawns in the endgame.

Opening Lines: The most common variation of the Sicilian Dragon is the Yugoslav Attack. 1. e4 c5 2.Nf3 d6 3. d4 cxd4 4. Nxd4 Nf6 5. Nc3 g6 6. Be3 (the defining move of the Yugoslav attack) 6... Bg7 7. Qd2 0-0 8. f3 (necessary to prevent Black from playing 8...Ng4 to attack White's dark-squared bishop; 8.f3 also gives e4 extra defense and prepares to launch a pawn storm with the move g4) 8... Nc6 9. 0-0-0 (9.Bc4 is also a very common move in this position) 9... d5 (the main line; other ideas include 9...Nxd4 and 9...Bd7).

Boleslavsky hole

Openings: Primary: Sicilian Najdorf, Classical, Sveshnikov, Kalashnikov. Other: Sicilian Prins, Moscow, O'Kelly (2... a6), King's English (with colors reversed), Pirc, Philidor, Ruy Lopez (Spanish), Italian

Character: Open, dynamic game.

Themes for White: taking control the d5 , exploiting the backward d6-pawn, f2–f4 break.

Themes for Black: d6–d5 break, queenside minority attack, the c4-square.

It is a paradoxical idea that Black can strive for equality by voluntarily creating a hole on d5. The entire game revolves around control of the d5-square. Black must play very carefully or White will place a knight on d5 and obtain a commanding positional advantage. Black almost always equalizes, and might even obtain a slight edge, if the d6–d5 break can be made.  Black has two options for their : on e6 and on b7 (after ...a7–a6 and ...b7–b5). Unusually for an open formation, bishops become inferior to knights because of the overarching importance of d5: White will often exchange Bg5xf6, and Black usually prefers to give up their queen's bishop rather than a knight in exchange for a white knight if it gets to d5. This formation can be reached from the d5 chain formation after Black gets the c7-c6 break and exchanges the c pawn for White's d pawn. 

Maróczy Bind

Openings: Primary: Sicilian, King's Indian Defence. Other: Symmetrical English, King's English (with colors reversed), Queen's Indian Defence, Nimzo-Indian Defence.

Character: Semi-open game.

Themes for White: Nd4–c2–e3, fianchettoing one or both bishops, the Maróczy hop (Nc3–d5 followed by e4xd5 with terrific pressure on the e-file), kingside attack, c4–c5 and e4–e5 breaks.

Themes for Black: b7–b5 break, f7–f5 break (especially with a fianchettoed king's bishop), d6–d5 break (prepared with ...e7–e6).

The Maróczy bind, named after Géza Maróczy, has a fearsome reputation. Chess masters once believed that allowing the bind was a mistake as Black always gave White a significant advantage. Conversely, the formation takes time to set up and limits the activity of White's light-squared bishop, which can buy Black some breathing room to accomplish this break.

Hedgehog

Openings: Primary: Symmetrical English, Sicilian. Other: King's English (with colors reversed), King's Indian Defence (Sämisch), Queen's Indian Defense, Nimzo-Indian Defence, Nimzo-Larsen Attack.

Character: Closed, Semi-open game.

The Hedgehog is a formation similar to the Maróczy bind, and shares the strategic ideas with that formation. Typically, the Maróczy bind would transpose into the Hedgehog formation.

Rauzer formation

Openings: Primary: King's Indian, Old Indian (colors reversed), Ruy Lopez, Italian Game. Other: Ruy Lopez (colors reversed), Italian Game (colors reversed), Sicilian Kramnik. The notation in the rest of this section refers to the colors reversed version.

Character: Semi-open game.

Themes for White: d6 weakness, c4–c5 push, a3–f8 diagonal, queenside pawn storm.

Themes for Black: d4 weakness, a1–h8 diagonal, f4-square, kingside attack, trading pieces for a superior endgame.

The Rauzer formation is named after Rauzer who introduced it in the Ruy Lopez. It can also rarely occur in the Ruy Lopez with colors reversed.

It is considered to give Black excellent chances because d6 is much less of a hole than White's d4. If the black king's bishop is fianchettoed it is common to see it undeveloped to f8 to control the vital c5- and d6-squares, or remove White's dark-squared bishop, the guardian of the hole.

The Rauzer formation is often misjudged by beginners. In the position on the left, White appears to have a development lead while Black's position appears to be riddled with holes. In reality, it is Black who stands clearly better, because White has no real way to improve their position while Black can improve by exploiting the d4-square (see complete game on Java (Applet) board).

Boleslavsky Wall

Openings: Primary: King's Indian. Other: English, Pirc, Ruy Lopez, Philidor, Italian Game.

Character: Semi-open game, slow buildup.
 
Occurs after exchange of pawns on d4.  Name given by Hans Kmoch.

Themes for White: exploitation of d6 weakness, e4–e5 and c4–c5 breaks, minority attack with ...b2–b4–b5.

Themes for Black: attacking the e4- and c4-pawns, d6–d5 and f7–f5 breaks, queenside play with ...a7–a5–a4.

The wall is yet another structure that leaves Black with a d-pawn weakness, but prevents White from taking control of the center and gives Black active piece play and an opportunity to play on either side of the board.

d5 chain

Openings: Primary: King's Indian, Pirc, Philidor. Other: Benoni, Ruy Lopez (Spanish), Trompowsky, English, Italian Game, Four Knights Game (Scotch variation)

Character: Closed game with opposite side activity.

Themes for White: Massive queenside space advantage, c2–c4–c5 break (optionally prepared with b2–b4), prophylaxis with ...g2–g4 (after f2–f3), f2–f4 break.

Themes for Black: kingside attack, f7–f5 break, g7–g5–g4 break (after f2–f3), c7–c6 break, prophylaxis with ...c6–c5 or ...c7–c5 transposing to a full Benoni formation.

The chain arises from a variety of openings but most commonly in the heavily analyzed King's Indian Classical variation. The theme is a race for a breakthrough on opposite flanks – Black must try to whip up a kingside attack before White's  penetrate with devastating effect on the c-file. The position was thought to strongly favor White until a seminal game (Taimanov–Najdorf 1953) where Black introduced the maneuver ...Rf8–f7, ...Bg7–f8, ...Rf7–g7. When the chain arises in the Ruy Lopez, play is much slower with tempo being of little value and featuring piece maneuvering by both sides, Black focusing on the c7–c6 break and White often trying to play on the kingside with the f2–f4 break. This may transpose into the Boleslavsky hole formation or the Maróczy Bind after Black plays the c7-c6 break and exchanges the c pawn for White's d pawn.

e5 chain

Openings: Primary: French. Other: Nimzowitsch, Trompowsky, Caro–Kann (Advance Variation), Bogo-Indian, London System, Colle System, Sicilian (Rossolimo, Alapin, Closed, O'Kelly), Nimzo–Larsen Attack (colors reversed), King's English (colors reversed).

Character: Closed/semi-open but sharp game.

Themes for White: kingside mating attack, f2–f4–f5 break.

Themes for Black: Exchanging the hemmed-in queen's bishop, c7–c5 and f7–f6 breaks.

Due to White's kingside space advantage and development advantage, Black must generate counterplay or be mated. Novices often lose to the sparkling Greek gift sacrifice. Attacking the head of the pawn chain with ...f7–f6 is seen as frequently as attacking its base, because it is harder for White to defend the head of the chain than in the d5 chain. In response to exf6, Black accepts a backward e6-pawn in exchange for freeing their position (the b8–h2 diagonal and the semi-open f-file) and the possibility of a further e6–e5 break. If White exchanges with d4xc5 it is called the Wedge formation. White gets an outpost on d4 and the possibility of exploiting the dark squares while Black gets an overextended e5 pawn to work on.

Modern Benoni formation

Openings: Primary: Modern Benoni, Queen's Indian Defence, King's Indian Defence Modern Defence, Ruy Lopez, Italian Game. Other: Trompowsky, Ruy Lopez (colors reversed), Italian Game (colors reversed), Réti Opening (colors reversed), King's Indian Attack (colors reversed), Sicilian Defence (Moscow, Rossolimo).

Character: Semi-open game.

Themes for White: Central pawn majority, e4–e5 break.

Themes for Black: Queenside pawn majority.

Giuoco Piano – Isolani formation

Openings: Primary: Giuoco Piano. Other: French (Steiner, Exchange), Ruy Lopez (Berlin, Møller, Anti-Marshall), Petrov, King's English, French (colors reversed), Sicilian Alapin (colors reversed), Queen's Gambit Accepted (3.e3 variation)

Character: Open game.

Themes for White:

Themes for Black: Blockading the isolani, trading pieces for a favorable endgame.

Queen's Gambit – Isolani formation 

Openings: Primary: Queen's Gambit. Other: French, Sicilian Alapin, Symmetrical English, Caro–Kann, Nimzo-Indian, Slav.

Character: .

Themes for White: d4–d5 break, sacrifice of the isolani, outpost on e5, kingside attack.

Themes for Black: Blockading the isolani, trading pieces for a favorable endgame.

The isolani leads to lively play revolving around the d5-square. If Black can clamp down on the pawn, their positional strengths and threat of exchanges give them the advantage. If not, the threat of the d4–d5 break is ever-present, and the isolani can sometimes be sacrificed to unleash the potential of White's pieces, enabling White to whip up a whirlwind attack. Garry Kasparov is famous for the speculative d4–d5 sacrifice.

Hanging pawns

Openings: Primary: Queen's Gambit Declined. Other: Queen's Indian Defense, Symmetrical English, Sicilian (Alapin).

Character: Open game.

Themes for White: Line opening advance in the center, kingside attack.

Themes for Black: Forcing a pawn advance and blockading the pair, conversion to isolani.

The term is used almost exclusively for pawns on the c- and d-files, and usually for two pawns on the same rank (side by side). They can be a strength, a weakness or neutral, depending on the position. They are typically an attacking rather than a defensive asset. The play revolves around Black trying to force one of the pawns to advance. If Black can establish a permanent blockade the game is positionally won. On the other hand, White aims to keep the pawns hanging, trying to generate a kingside attack leveraging off of their superior center control. Other themes for White include tactical possibilities and line opening breaks in the center.

Carlsbad formation

Openings: Primary: Queen's Gambit Declined. Other: Caro–Kann (colors reversed), Colle System (colors reversed), London System (colors reversed).

Character: Semi-open game.

Themes for White: Minority attack, e3–e4 break.

Themes for Black: e4 outpost, kingside attack.

Panov formation

Openings: Primary: Queen's Gambit Declined, Caro–Kann. Other: Alekhine Defense, QGD Tarrasch Defense (colors reversed), Symmetrical English, Symmetrical English (colors reversed).

Character: Semi-open, dynamic game.

Themes for White: Exploiting the dark squares, d6 outpost; queenside majority in the endgame, with an advanced pawn.

Themes for Black: e4 outpost, kingside attack, White's overextended pawn, e6–e5 and b7–b6 breaks.

Stonewall formation

Openings: Primary: Dutch Defense. Other: Colle System, Bird's Opening (with colors reversed).

Character: Closed game, uncomplicated strategy.

Themes: Exchanging the bad bishop, e4/e5 outposts, breaks on the c and g files.

Players must carefully consider how to recapture on the e4/e5-square, since it alters the symmetric pawn formation and creates strategic subtleties.

Botvinnik system

Openings: Primary: English, Dutch, King's Indian Attack. Other: Sicilian (Closed, Moscow), Vienna Game, Bishop's Opening.

Character: Closed game, uncomplicated strategy.

Themes: Exchanging the bad bishop, d4/d5 outposts, breaks on the b- and f-files.

This structure appears in one of Botvinnik's treatments of the English. Players must carefully consider how to recapture on the d4/d5-square, since it alters the symmetric pawn formation and creates strategic subtleties. Adding the typical White fianchetto of the king's bishop to this structure provides significant pressure along the long diagonal, and usually prepares the f2–f4–f5 break.

Closed Sicilian formation

Openings: Primary: Closed Sicilian, Closed English (colors reversed).

Character: Closed, complicated position.

Themes for White: kingside pawn storm, c2–c3 and d3–d4 break.

Themes for Black: queenside pawn storm, a1–h8 diagonal.

See also
Outline of chess: Pawn structure
Chess opening
Chess strategy
Chess terminology
Backward pawn
Connected pawns
Doubled pawns
Isolated pawn
Hedgehog (chess)

References

Further reading

Chess terminology
Chess strategy
Chess theory